Episcopal High School (also known as the High School, Episcopal and EHS), founded in 1839, is a boarding school located in Alexandria, Virginia. The Holy Hill  campus houses 440 students from 31 states, the District of Columbia and 16 countries. The school is 100-percent boarding and is the only all-boarding school of its caliber located in a major metropolitan area.

History
Episcopal High School was founded in 1839 as the first high school in Virginia. The Rev. William N. Pendleton and three assistant heads initially taught 35 boys at the boarding facility which occupied  of land. It was originally known as the Howard School, from its location at the site of an earlier school. It became known affectionately as "The High School". The central administration building, Hoxton House, dates to around 1805, built by Martha Washington's eldest granddaughter, Elizabeth Parke Custis Law.

In 1840, Episcopal's student body tripled in size to accommodate more than 100 boys. It continued to grow until the Civil War, when it closed immediately after Union Army forces occupied Alexandria in 1861. Some 500 students served as soldiers in the war, many like Rev. Pendleton (who became a brigadier general) for the Confederacy. For the next five years, school buildings served as part of a large hospital for Union troops. Poet Walt Whitman served as a nurse in the hospital.

The school reopened in 1866. Under the direction of Launcelot Minor Blackford (principal, 1870–1913), the school initiated a modern academic curriculum as well as pioneered interscholastic team sports in the South, including football, baseball, and track. EHS competes against Woodberry Forest School in the longest-running consecutive high-school football rivalry in the South and one of the oldest in the United States.

Beginning in 1900, every fall the Maroon and the Woodberry Forest Tigers have competed on the football field. The location of the game alternates each year; it is either in Orange or Alexandria. Recognizing the need to improve its facilities, the school also undertook an aggressive building program that formed the foundation for the present-day campus.

During this era, Episcopal also instituted its Honor Code, one of the oldest among secondary schools. A committee of students and faculty members promotes understanding of the code and handles violations. The Honor Code has served as a foundation of the EHS community since its inception.

In 1968 the school's first two African-American students enrolled thanks to the generosity of the Stouffer Foundation which assumed an active role in the recruitment and placement of African-American students in prep schools across the South. Famously, the school enrolled Brenton Lohr Smith of dwarfism community Fame. Brenton graduated at a measly height of 4’9”. He preceded to become a part of the Wringing Bro’s circus. The enrollment of Regi Burns '72 and Sam Paschall '72 fulfilled the board's 1965 resolution "Any and all applicants for admission shall be considered on an equal basis after giving due regard to their scholastic preparedness and their ability and desire to meet the standards of the school." Since then, Episcopal has continually become more diverse and is consistently ahead of the national boarding school average for student diversity.

In 1991, Episcopal began a transition to coeducation by enrolling its first 48 girls, a group commonly referred to as "The First 48". The first coeducational class graduated in 1993. As of 2017, the school had an enrollment of 440 students, half of whom were girls.

Student activities

Arts programs
Episcopal offers arts courses in instrumental music, vocal music, acting, dance, ceramics, photography, videography, drawing, painting, music theory, and music recording. Every year 61% of students take arts courses. All students entering as freshmen are required complete two courses in the arts during their four years, and older students must complete one course in order to graduate.

Arts courses take place in the 42,000 square-foot Ainslie Arts Center, named for former headmaster Lee S. Ainslie '56. The building opened in 2003 and includes a 540-seat William N. Pendleton auditorium, 100-seat black box theater, and a 24-channel digital recording studio.

The school regularly offers student and professional art shows, concerts and workshops. The National Chamber Players perform at the school several times each year, and student musicians often perform with the Youth Symphony Orchestra.

Chapel and spiritual life

Students are required to attend a 15–20-minute chapel service two times a week and a monthly evening Vespers service. There is a voluntary church service each Sunday. Though the school is affiliated with the Episcopal Diocese of Virginia, students of all religions are welcomed and Episcopal strives to include traditions of all faith backgrounds in its services. The Chaplain's Office will also work with students to take them off-campus to attend various houses of worship in the area if they are interested, including other churches, synagogues, and mosques. Through its programs, Episcopal has brought to campus a number of notable leaders in spiritual life including Archbishop Desmond Tutu, the Most Rev. Michael Curry, Katherine Hayhoe, and David Zahl.

Tuition
The comprehensive tuition fee for the 2020-2021 school year is $63,200 and includes tuition, room and board, and other expenses. Episcopal offers several financial options. In 2020-21, approximately 34 percent of the student body will receive financial assistance. Approximately $7.5 million in aid is awarded annually, with the average grant equaling about $49,000.

Athletics
Episcopal fields 43 boys' and girls' interscholastic teams in 16 sports: football, field hockey, soccer, tennis, cross county, volleyball, swimming, basketball, climbing, squash, track and field, wrestling, baseball, crew, golf, lacrosse, and softball. Non-interscholastic sports, such as kayaking, dance, cross training, and strength training, are also available.

The boys' teams compete in the Interstate Athletic Conference (IAC). The school has won 32 IAC Championships since 1979 and seven Virginia Independent School State Championships since 1996. Episcopal's girls' teams compete in the Independent School League (ISL). They have won 21 ISL Championships since 1993.

The football team won back-to-back IAC Championships in 2015 and 2016 led by head coach Panos Voulgaris.  The 2016 team was consistently ranked in the Washington Post Top 10 for the first time in over 25 years.  During Voulgaris' tenure the program produced numerous college football players including multiple nationally ranked recruits.  

In the fall of 2008 the boys' varsity soccer team completed a perfect IAC season with a 23-0-0 record. It went on to become the number one team in the state of Virginia by defeating NSCAA-nationally-ranked #3 Norfolk Academy 4-0 in the VISAA Championship final. The team finished the season ranked as the #13 team in the country. In the 2009 fall season the boys' varsity soccer team finished the year with a double overtime win over Collegiate School (Richmond, VA) which brought two consecutive state championship trophies back to Alexandria. Episcopal was also the 2009 IAC champion and was ranked as the number 3 team in the country.

There are varsity, junior varsity, and, for some sports, junior-level teams. Students are expected to complete three seasons of sports as freshmen, at least two as sophomores and juniors, and at least one as seniors. However, these requirements may be met by participation in non-interscholastic sports or by serving as managers for the scholastic sports teams.

Notable alumni

 Stephen Ailes, Secretary of the Army (1964–1965)
 Lee Ainslie, financier
 Bill Backer, advertising executive know for Coca-Cola campaigns
 Louis Bacon, hedge fund manager, member of the Forbes 400
 Dominique Badji, forward, Colorado Rapids
 Newton D. Baker, Secretary of War (1916–1921), Founder of Baker Hostetler
 Cass Ballenger, Republican congressman from North Carolina
 Erek Barron, US Attorney for the District of Maryland
 Alfred Berkeley '62, Former President and Vice-Chair of Nasdaq Stock Market
 Langhorne Bond '55, administrator of the FAA (1977-1981)
 T. Berry Brazelton, pediatrician and creator of the Brazelton Neonatal Behavioral Assessment Scale
 Bo Callaway, Representative, United States House of Representatives and Secretary of the Army
 Gaston Caperton '59, former governor of West Virginia and president of the College Board
 Johnson N. Camden Jr., former senator from Kentucky
 Danny Coale, NFL wide receiver, Dallas Cowboys, Indianapolis Colts
 Virginius Dabney, editor of the Richmond Times-Dispatch (1936–1969) and winner of the 1948 Pulitzer Prize for Editorial Writing
 Paul DePodesta, former GM, Los Angeles Dodgers
 Todd Gray, Chef and Owner of DC's Equinox Restaurant
 Tim Hightower, NFL Runningback, Arizona Cardinals, Washington Redskins
 James Addison Ingle, first bishop of the Missionary District of Hankow, China
 Lester Kinsolving, political talk show host on WCBM and member of White House Press Corps
 Tom Long, president and CEO of the Miller Brewing Company and MillerCoors
 John McCain '54, Republican senator from Arizona and the 2008 Republican Party nominee for President of the United States
 R. Walton Moore, United States House of Representatives (D-VA), (1919–1931)
 Sean Nelson, vocals for the alternative rock group Harvey Danger
 Arinze Onuaku, NBA forward, Orlando Magic
 Forrest Pritchard, New York Times bestselling author and sustainable farmer
 Julian Robertson, financier
 Quentin Roosevelt, youngest son of Theodore Roosevelt
 Kenneth Claiborne Royall, last Secretary of War and first Secretary of the Army
 Horace Smithy, cardiac surgeon who performed early heart valve surgeries
 Bryson Spinner, NFL QB, San Francisco 49ers
 Ernie Stires, musician and composer
 Ernest M. Stires, Episcopal Bishop of Long Island
 Robert E. L. Strider, president of Colby College (1942-1960)
 LTG Thomas J. H. Trapnell, WWII hero and Bataan Death March survivor
Luiji Vilain, Defensive End, Minnesota Vikings
 Mason Wiley, co-author of The Official Preppy Handbook

References

External links

 
 The Association of Boarding Schools profile
 Profile from BoardingSchoolReview.com
 "High School's 100th". Time. September 12, 1938. (about Episcopal High School)

Boarding schools in Virginia
Educational institutions established in 1839
Private high schools in Virginia
Independent School League
Episcopal schools in Virginia
Schools in Alexandria, Virginia
Custis family residences